Lourawls "Tum Tum" Nairn Jr. (born October 8, 1994) is a Bahamian former basketball player and current assistant coach for the Southern Utah Thunderbirds. He previously was head coach at Sunrise Christian Academy. He played college basketball for the Michigan State Spartans, where he would later be a graduate manager.

Early life
Nairn Jr. was brought up in Nassau, Bahamas.

College career
Nairn Jr. enrolled at Michigan State in 2014. He appeared in 137 games for the team, including 65 starts, averaging 2.5 points in 19.5 minutes per game. As a freshman, he was member of the 2015 Final Four team.

National team career
Nairn Jr. was a member of the Bahamas junior national basketball teams program from the age of 16. On June 28, 2018, he played for the Bahamas senior national basketball team in a 2019 FIBA World Cup qualifying game against the U.S. Virgin Islands, scoring 13 points on 7-for-10 shooting in an 84-74 loss.

Post playing career
In 2018, he joined the Phoenix Suns front office with a role in player development.

Personal life
He was named after the singer Lou Rawls.

Nairn is the older brother of LaQuan Nairn who represents The Bahamas internationally in long jump.

References

External links
Profile at realgm.com
Michican State profile at msuspartans.com

1994 births
Living people
Bahamian expatriate basketball people in the United States
Bahamian men's basketball players
Basketball players from Kansas
Michigan State Spartans men's basketball players
Point guards
Sportspeople from Nassau, Bahamas